This is a list of airports in East Timor (Timor-Leste), sorted by location.



Airports 

Airport names shown in bold indicate the airport has scheduled service on commercial airlines.

See also 
 Transport in East Timor
 List of airports by ICAO code: W#WP - East Timor (Timor-Leste)
 Wikipedia:WikiProject Aviation/Airline destination lists: Asia#Timor-Leste
 List of airports in Indonesia which covers West Timor

References 
 Aeronautical Information Publication (AIP) from Timor-Leste Civil Aviation Department
 
  - includes IATA codes
 Great Circle Mapper: East Timor - IATA and ICAO codes
 World Aero Data: East Timor - IATA codes

Further reading

 

East Timor
 
Airports
East Timor
Airports